European Road Transport Telematics Implementation Coordination (ERTICO - ITS Europe) is an intelligent transportation system (ITS) organization in Europe that promotes research and defines ITS industry standards.
It connects public authorities, industry, infrastructure operators, users, national ITS associations and other organisations.
It is seen to be a think tank for intelligent transportation systems.

History 
The organization was founded in 1992 by members of the European Commission, ministries of transport and European industry. 

IERTICO-ITS Europe promotes an open framework for telematics services and specific standards in various countries.

The ERTICO Partners and ERTICO team promote development and deployment of ITS across Europe and beyond. ERTICO is one of the main organizers of the World Congress on Intelligent Transport Systems.

Intelligent mobility enables all modes of transport to communicate with one another, so travelers have access to information needed to make their travel choices.
Under the auspices of ERTICO's "Telematics Forum" the existing telematics standards GATS (Global Automotive Telematics Standard) and ACP (Application Communication Protocol) were merged into the new XML-based one called GTP (Global Telematics Protocol) in 2003.

See also 
 List of ITS associations

References

External links
 

Information technology organizations based in Europe
Intelligent transportation systems